Bouras Djamel is an Algerian politician  and the Third Vice President of the Pan-African Parliament representing the Northern African Region. He was designated Acting President starting in August 2020, with his term set to end when the full Bureau of the PAP is reconstituted at the start of the next plenary session.

References

Living people
Algerian politicians
1971 births
Presidents of Pan-African Parliament